Vicia caroliniana (common name Carolina vetch, or Carolina wood vetch), is a plant found in North America.

Uses
The Cherokee use this plant for a variety of medicinal purposes. It is used for back pains, local pains,  to toughen muscles, for muscular cramps, twitching and is rubbed on stomach cramps. They also use a compound for rheumatism, for an affliction called "blacks", and it is taken for wind before a ball game. An infusion is used for muscle pain, in that it is rubbed on scratches made over the location of the pain. An infusion is also taken as an emetic. It is also used internally with Pseudognaphalium obtusifolium ssp. obtusifolium for rheumatism.

References

caroliniana
Flora of the Northeastern United States
Flora of the Southeastern United States
Flora of the North-Central United States
Flora of the Appalachian Mountains
Plants used in traditional Native American medicine
Plants described in 1788
Flora of the South-Central United States
Flora without expected TNC conservation status